David Keith Rodney Buck (17 October 1933 – 27 January 1989) was an English actor.

Buck was born in London, the son of Joseph Buck and Enid Marguerite (née Webb). He starred in many television productions from 1959 until 1989. One of his earlier roles was that of Horatio Hornblower in an episode entitled "Hornblower" (1963), in the Alcoa Premiere TV series. 

He played Winston Smith in Theatre 625: The World of George Orwell: 1984 (1965), a remake of Nigel Kneale's adaptation of the novel. In the first two series of the ITV horror and supernatural anthology series Mystery and Imagination (1966–68) he played the series narrator Richard Beckett (from Sheridan Le Fanu's story "The Flying Dragon") whose character also became involved in some of the other stories adapted. His film career included roles in Dr. Syn, Alias the Scarecrow (1963), The Sandwich Man (1966), the Hammer film The Mummy's Shroud (1967), Deadfall (1968) and Taste of Excitement (1970). He also had a role as Royal Air Force Squadron Leader David "Scotty" Scott in the film Mosquito Squadron (1969), with David McCallum, in which his character is shot down during a low-level bombing raid over Northern France in 1944 and assumed killed.

Later, he was a voice actor for the films The Lord of the Rings (1978), for which he provided the voice of Gimli, and The Dark Crystal (1982), where he voiced SkekNa the Slave Master. Buck portrayed Dr. Watson in the 1978 BBC Radio 4 series of 13 Sherlock Holmes short stories.

Buck died of cancer in 1989. At the time of his death, he was married to the actress Madeline Smith, who featured in the film version of Up Pompeii (1971) and numerous comedy programmes in the 1970s.

Filmography

References

External links

1936 births
1989 deaths
Deaths from cancer in England
English male film actors
English male television actors
English male voice actors
People educated at Mill Hill School
20th-century English male actors